Acaua exotica is a species of beetle in the family Cerambycidae, and the only species in the genus Acaua. It was described by Martins and Galileo in 1995.

References

Desmiphorini
Beetles described in 1995